Parung (Sundanese:ᮕᮛᮥᮀ) is a town and district in Indonesia that is located in the southwestern suburb of South Jakarta but officially still within the area of the Regency of Bogor. Those who travel from Jakarta to Bogor through the western alternative road will have to pass Parung.

It has a traditional market called Pasar Parung as its commercial centre. The market is situated exactly on both sides of the main road which inevitably causes daily traffic congestion. Pasar Parung is marked by a huge tree which is called Pohon Jubleg by the locals.

Cultures
Parung is one of the sub-districts in Bogor Regency, West Java. This area is close to the border of South Tangerang and Depok which is the center of Betawi culture so that there is a mix of Betawi culture with local Sundanese culture in the Parung area.

The mixing of cultures in the Parung sub-district causes the typical arts of the Parung sub-district to also vary. There are religious arts such as marawis, tambourine, then kelaran parade arts and cucurak which have existed in Parung sub-district since ancient times. Traditional cultural values such as marawis and tambourines are still inherent in Parung sub-district.

Sundanese language is also still used by the community in several villages in the Parung sub-district which borders Ciseeng district and Kemang district, but some still use Betawi language in the area bordering Depok and South Tangerang. The language used in Parung is also a mixture of cultures between nine villages in Parung District.

Villages
Parung is divided into 9 villages (desa):
 Bojongindah
 Bojongsempu
 Cogreg
 Iwul
 Jabonmekar
 Pamagersari
 Parung
 Waru
 Warujaya

References

External links
 

Districts of Bogor Regency